Hazel Hutchins is a Canadian children's author.

Her book Tess (1995) was nominated for a Governor General's Award. She has also received the Writers Guild of Alberta Award for Children's Literature and the Shining Willow Young Readers' Choice Award.

She lives in Canmore, Alberta.

Bibliography
Anastasia Morningstar and the Crystal Butterfly (1984)
Leanna Builds a Genie Trap (1986)
Ben's Snow Song (1987)
Casey Webber, The Great (1988)
Norman's Snowball (1989)
Nicholas at the Library (1990)
Katie's Babbling Brother (1991)
A Cat of Artimus Pride (1991)
And You Can Be the Cat (1992)
The Catfish Palace (1993)
The Best of Arlie Zack (1993)
The Three and Many Wishes of Jason Reid (1993)
Within A Painted Past (1994)
Believing Sophie (1995)
Tess - (1995)
Yancy and Bear (1996)
Shoot for the Moon, Robyn (1997)
The Prince of Tarn (1997)
Robyn's Want Ad (1998)
It's Raining, Yancy and Bear (1998)
One Duck (1999)
Robyn and the Bears (2000)
Two So Small (2000)
The Wide World of Suzie Mallard (2000)
One Dark Night (2001)
Robyn's Art Attack (2002)
T J and the Cats (2002)
I'd Know You Anywhere (2002)
T J and the Haunted House (2003)
Robyn Make the News (2003)
The Sidewalk Rescue  (2004)
Skate, Robyn, Skate! (2004)
A Second is a Hiccup  (2004)
TJ and the Rockets (2004)
Beneath the Bridge  (2004)
Robyn's Party-in-the-Park  (2004)
Sarah and the Magic Science Project (2005)
TJ and the Sports Fanatic (2006)
The List (2007)

References

External links

Hazel Hutchins home page

Canadian children's writers
Writers from Alberta
People from Canmore, Alberta
Living people
Canadian women children's writers
Year of birth missing (living people)